Dukinfield and Ashton railway station served Dukinfield in Greater Manchester, England. The station was built at high level on a viaduct as it passed directly above Alma Bridge, King Street, Dukinfield. Access to the platforms was via an entrance in Cooper Street and ascending a staircase inside one of viaduct pillars. The viaduct extended from Whiteland, Ashton under Lyne, transversed the Tame Valley, passing over Crescent Road, King Street, Wharf Street, Charles Street and the Peak Forrest Canal before plunging under the Old Great Central line at Guide Bride and emerging at Audenshaw (Hooley Hill). The station was opened on 2 October 1893 by the London and North Western Railway, and was closed on 25 September 1950 by British Railways.

References

External links
1940s OS map of the area
1912 Junction diagram of the Ashton Area

Disused railway stations in Tameside
Former London and North Western Railway stations
Railway stations in Great Britain opened in 1893
Railway stations in Great Britain closed in 1950
Dukinfield